A by-election was held for the Australian House of Representatives seat of La Trobe on 9 April 1960. This was triggered by the resignation of Liberal MP Richard Casey to take up a life peerage in the British House of Lords. A by-election for the seat of Hunter was held on the same day.

The by-election was won by Liberal candidate John Jess.

Results

References

1960 elections in Australia
Victorian federal by-elections
1960s in Melbourne
April 1960 events in Australia